Christopher Battaglia (February 18, 1908 – July 25, 1977) better known as Battling Battalino, was an American World Featherweight boxing champion. Born in Hartford, Connecticut, Battalino engaged in 88 bouts during his career, of which he won 57 (23 knockouts), lost 26, and drew 3. He was managed by Hy Malley and Lenny Marello. He was inducted into the International Boxing Hall of Fame in 2003.

Early life and amateur boxing career
Christopher Battaglia was born on February 18, 1908, to an Italian family in Hartford, Connecticut. The son of Italian immigrants, he never attended high school, but worked in a typewriter factory and labored in the tobacco fields. 

A good amateur boxer, Battalino won the National AAU featherweight championship in Boston in 1927. He had fifty-nine amateur bouts, knocking out forty-six of his opponents.

Professional boxer
As a professional, Battalino would become known as a courageous and rugged fighter with good inside boxing abilities.  He was not known for a disciplined and studied boxing technique, but rather, a strong and relentless attack.

Taking the world featherweight championship from André Routis, September, 1929 
Battalino became a professional boxer in June 1927. His first big win came on July 26, 1929, when he upset NBA world bantamweight champion "Panama" Al Brown on a 10-round decision in Hartford, Connecticut.  Battalino knocked Brown down for a short count in the third.  He won the first four rounds, and held his own through the remaining six.

The victory over Brown made Battalino a top contender and garnered him a title match with world featherweight champion André Routis on September 23, 1929, in his hometown, Hartford, Connecticut. The 21-year-old Battalino made the most of his opportunity and defeated Frenchman Routis over 15 rounds, becoming one of the youngest competitors to win the world featherweight title.  Before an enthused audience of 13,866, Battalino outboxed and outsmarted the older Routis at both long range, and infighting, and landed more blows.  In a rare occurrence, Battalino was awarded all fifteen of the rounds in the championship fight.  The new champion had become a Hartford Hero when the Mayor presented him a medal the previous November for saving a child from drowning.

On April 25, 1930, Battalino defeated former world bantamweight champion Bushy Graham in a non-title fight before a crowd of 6,000, winning at least eight of the ten rounds in a points decision in Hartford, Connecticut. A stiff left hook in the fourth put Battalino to the mat for a count of eight, and Battalino piled up a comfortable points margin through the rest of the match. The referee scored nine rounds for Battalino.  Graham had little chance to mount an effective offense against the continuous attack of Battalino, and his right was tied up blocking the left of Battalino.  He made few effective blows with his left after his knockdown in the fourth.  According to several sources, Graham took "one of the worst trouncings of his career".  He had lost to former champion Graham on September 24, 1931, in a non-title split decision in Cincinnati, before later knocking out Graham on November 19, 1931, at Chicago Stadium 1:44 into the first round.

World featherweight title defenses, 1930-31
During the next two years he successfully defended his crown by defeating Ignacio Fernandez, Earl Mastro, and Hall of Famers Kid Chocolate, Fidel LaBarba and Freddie Miller.   

On February 25, 1930, Battalino defeated Ignazio Fernandez in a ten round points decision in Hartford, taking eight of ten rounds.  He beat Fernandez again in a title match in East Hartford, Connecticut, with a fifth round knockout, the first of Fernandez's career.

Battalino defeated Kid Chocolate in a fifteen round unanimous decision before a crowd of 15,000 at Madison Square Garden for the NYSAC world featherweight championship on December 12, 1930.  Battalino, who began as a 2-1 underdog, was down in the first round from a left and right to the chin for a count of nine, but made a comeback through the rest of the furious bout. As was his custom when boxing more skilled opponents, Battalino took the offensive, never giving his opponent room to fire effective counterpunches.  In a close bout, the Associated Press gave Battalino eight rounds, with only seven to Chocolate.  Battalino landed body blows against Chocolate to gain a points advantage in the eleventh through the fourteenth rounds, though Chocolate led the first two rounds as well as the eighth through tenth, and the final round by a shade.    

Battalino convincingly defeated Hall of Famer Fidel LaBarba at Madison Square Garden before a crowd of 9,000 in a fifteen round Unanimous Decision on May 22, 1931.  In the somewhat close NYSAC world featherweight title bout, Battalino brought the battle to LaBarba throughout the contest, though some ringside felt LaBarba had landed the cleaner blows.  Battalino was forced to score frequently during the infighting against the studied defense of LaBarba.  LaBarba was forced to hold frequently to rest from the constant assault of his opponent.  After his victory, most of the boxing world began to acknowledge that Battalino was a champion who had earned his title, as his opponent LaBarba was highly respected and a 2-1 favorite in the early betting.

Battalino defeated Earl Mastro in a ten round mixed decision NBA featherweight world championship bout on November 4, 1931, before a crowd of 14,000 at Chicago Stadium.  Mastro was briefly down in the second and down for a count of nine from a left to the body in the sixth.  In the last two rounds, Battalino closed strongly and battered Mastro nearly at will, extending his points margin.

Important non-title bouts while holding the world featherweight title
Battalino's best known competitors among his non-title victories included Lew Massey, Bud Taylor, Eddie Shea and Al Singer.

Battalino defeated Lew Massey on May 5, 1930, in a ten round mixed decision in Philadelphia before a crowd of 7,000.  Massey was close to being knocked out in the seventh but was saved by the bell.  The non-title bout was described as slow and deliberate and featured frequent clinching, though much was initiated by Massey who feared Battalino's right.  Massey had defeated Battalino the previous January in a ten round unanimous decision.  

Battalino defeated 1927 World Bantamweight Champion Bud Taylor in a ten round points decision before a modest 6,600 fans on August 18, 1930, in East Hartford, Connecticut.  In a compelling win, Battalino was awarded eight of the ten rounds by the referee with only the eighth to Taylor.  Using his right to protect his head and body, Battalino was very effective with his left, but almost always from inside, and the fight's consistent infighting and frequent clinching, did not please the crowd.  It was not until the eighth that a steady flurry of punches from long range took place, and Taylor was able to land a strong left to the chin of Battalino.   

In a non-title bout, Lois "Kid" Kaplan, 1925 world featherweight champion, defeated Battalino in a ten round points decision before a crowd of 7,000 on September 24, 1930, at Hurley Stadium in Hartford, Connecticut.  The referee and the single judge both gave Kaplan a convincing nine of the ten rounds, in an exciting bout that featured no knockdowns.  The referee gave Kaplan all but the fifth, which he scored as even.  Battalino was forced to fight on the defensive most of the way, but managed a few staggering rights to the head and heart of Kaplan, though they were never sufficient to slow Kaplan's attack more than momentarily.  Governor Trumball of Connecticut attended the bout and spoke briefly.

On September 15, 1931, Battalino defeated Eddie Shea before a crowd of 5000 in Hartford in a ten round points decision.  Battalino took a number of hard shots in the second, third, and fourth, but he fought fiercely in the infighting and may have landed some of the hardest and cleanest blows of his later career.  From the fourth round on, Battalino's infighting dominated and he was eventually credited with eight of the ten rounds.  

While still holding the championship, Battalino decisively defeated 1930 world lightweight champion Al Singer, before a crowd of 17,000 at New York's Madison Square Garden on December 11, 1931.  Battalino may have bobbed and weaved away from Singer's early volleys in the first, and was likely shaken by a blow or two, but his counterattack was devastating to his opponent.   Though Singer started strong very early in the opening round, he was soon put down three times by Battalino, and went down in the second from a series of rights to the chin for a count of seven.  After he rose, he was chased around the ring by Battalino who put him down again with a right to the chin for a count of four, just before the referee justifiably called the bout a technical knockout and helped move Singer to his corner.   Singer's labored retreat from Battalino after he was first put down, his inability to defend himself, and his struggle to mount an attack, indicated a boxer who had, at least for the moment, lost most of his physical faculties.  Both boxers were above the featherweight limit preventing any chance of the match being a featherweight title match.

Relinquishing the world featherweight championship, March, 1932
On January 27, 1932, Battalino once again defended the title against Freddie Miller before a small crowd of 2,000 in Cincinnati, Ohio.   The champion came in three pounds overweight and did not put up a good fight. Battalino went down in the third round from what the referee considered a harmless right to the chin.  When Battalino arose, Miller put him down again.  The referee stopped the fight and declared Miller the winner. The National Boxing Association and the New York State Athletic Commission, however, overruled the referee and declared the bout a "no contest." Having declared the bout a no contest, the title become vacant, as Battalino did not make the featherweight limit. To end any confusion about his championship status, Battalino voluntarily relinquished the title in March and moved up a weightclass to fight at the lightweight limit.

Late career as a lightweight
As a lightweight, he lost bouts with Hall of Famers Billy Petrolle and Barney Ross.

Battalino lost to Billy Petrolle on March 24, 1932, in Madison Square Garden in a twelve round technical knockout.  A crowd of 18,000 saw Petrolle cut Battalino into pieces with vicious lefts and rights to the head, tearing cuts all over his body, and finally stopping him 1:21 into the final round.  When a flurry of blows landed Battalino on the ropes, the referee finally called the bout.  Later on May 20, before 10,000 at Chicago Stadium, Petrolle won again by a ten round unanimous decision of the judges.  Though Battalino dropped Petrolle for a count of nine with a left hook in the first round, Petrolle came roaring back.  He took seven rounds with Battalino only three.

Battalino lost to the exceptional future light and welterweight champion Barney Ross on October 21, 1932, in a ten round unanimous decision at Chicago Stadium.  In a decisive victory, Ross was awarded nine of the ten rounds, using his left throughout and mounting a winning defense. The Hartford Courant gave Ross only seven of the ten rounds but had a hometown bias for Battalino.  In the first two rounds, Battalino was stung repeatedly by Ross's blows.  Ross's defense did not preclude Battalino from mounting relentless body attacks after the first two rounds, though Ross weathered them and consistently defended against them without great effect.  Ross may have even won the infighting, mounting more effective body blows than Battalino.

On October 23, 1934, Battalino defeated future World Colored Welterweight champion, Puerto Ricon boxer Cocoa Kid, in a seven round technical knockout in Hartford. As was typical of his style, Battalino mounted a successful and relentless body attack against his opponent that had him weak by the fifth round.  Battalino scored with four rapid rights to the head in the fifth. In the sixth, Battalino scored with powerful body blows to the midsection.

After boxing
Battalino's last bout was with Dick Turcotte in Hartford on January 30, 1940, which he lost in a ten round points decision.  When Battalino retired from boxing after the bout, he settled in Hartford, Connecticut, and worked as a construction laborer.

Battalino died on July 25, 1977, at Hartford Hospital in West Hartford, and was buried at the Mount St. Benedict Cemetery. He left a wife Lilian, two daughters, and six grandchildren.

Professional boxing record

See also
Lineal championship

References

Bibliography

External links

|-

  

1908 births
1977 deaths
American people of Italian descent
Boxers from Connecticut
Featherweight boxers
World featherweight boxing champions
Sportspeople from Hartford, Connecticut
American male boxers